László Bartha (born 9 February 1987) is a Hungarian football player who plays for Kozármisleny.

Club career
On 27 August 2021, Bartha moved to Kecskemét.

On 1 July 2022, Bartha returned to Kozármisleny.

Club statistics

Updated to games played as of 27 June 2020.

References

External links
Profile at hlsz.hu

1987 births
People from Komló
Sportspeople from Baranya County
Living people
Hungarian footballers
Hungary youth international footballers
Association football midfielders
Komlói Bányász SK footballers
Ferencvárosi TC footballers
Kozármisleny SE footballers
Paksi FC players
Kecskeméti TE players
Nemzeti Bajnokság I players
Nemzeti Bajnokság II players